Rebecca Peterson was the defending champion, but chose not to participate.

Kristie Ahn won the title, defeating Amanda Anisimova in the final, 1–6, 6–2, 6–2.

Seeds

Draw

Finals

Top half

Bottom half

References
Main Draw

Hardee's Pro Classic - Singles
Hardee's Pro Classic